Phenyl isocyanate is an organic compound typically abbreviated PhNCO. The molecule consists of a phenyl ring attached to the isocyanate functional group.  It is a colourless liquid that reacts with water. Phenyl isocyanate has a strong odor and tearing vapours, therefore it has to be handled with care.  

Characteristic of other isocyanates, it reacts with amines to give ureas. Similarly, reacts with alcohols to form carbamates. 

It is used in addition with triethylamine to activate nitro groups to undergo (C,O) 1,3-dipolar cycloaddition (as opposed to O,O). The nitro group (RCH2NO2) is converted to RCNO in the reaction, with CO2 as one of the by products.

Structure
PhNCO is a planar molecule, according to X-ray crystallography.  The N=C=O linkage is nearly linear.  The C=N and C=O distances are respectively 1.195 and 1.173 Å.

References

External links 
 Phenyl Isocyanate Data Sheet

Isocyanates
Phenyl compounds